Santa Ana Municipality may refer to:
 Santa Ana Municipality, Beni, Bolivia
 Santa Ana, Magdalena, Colombia
 Santa Ana Municipality, Oaxaca, Mexico
 Santa Ana Municipality, Sonora, Mexico
 Santa Ana Municipality, Anzoátegui, Venezuela
 Santa Ana, Francisco Morazán, Honduras
 Santa Ana Municipality, El Salvador

Municipality name disambiguation pages